Finstertalspeicher is a reservoir in Tyrol, Austria.

Lakes of Tyrol (state)
Imst District
Innsbruck-Land District